Samikannu (15 April 1923 – 3 June 2017) was an Indian actor who had acted in over 400 Tamil-language films in supporting and comedy roles. He is capable of doing whatever role is best. He is notable movie acted Character as 'Payapulla' in Mullum Malarum along with 'Superstar' Rajinikanth. He is one of the most recognizable characters in the films of Director J.Mahendran.

Early life 
He started acting in plays from the age of 8. He made his film Pudhu Yugam debut in 1954.

Career 
The role of Saritha's father in the film Vandichakkaram with Sivakumar has paved the way for tears. His last film he acted in was Vaikarai Pookkal. The film released in 1996.

Family 
He has two sons and two daughters.

Death 
He died in Chennai on Saturday 3 June 2017 at the age of 95 due to ill health.

Filmography 
This is a partial filmography. You can expand it.

1950s

1960s

1970s

1980s

1990s

References 

1923 births
2017 deaths
Indian male actors